Thurston "Smitty" Smith (born March 9, 1958) is an American businessman and politician who is a member of the California State Assembly from the 33rd district. He assumed office on December 7, 2020, succeeding Jay Obernolte.

Early life and education 
Smith was born in Hesperia, California, and took classes at Victor Valley College.

Career 
Prior to his election to the Assembly, Smith owned a concrete company. He served on the Hesperia City Council from 2006 to 2014 and on the Mohave Valley Water Agency from 2016 to 2018. After Jay Obernolte declined to seek re-election to the Assembly and instead run for California's 8th congressional district, Smith announced his candidacy to succeed him. Smith placed first in the nonpartisan blanket primary and defeated fellow Republican Rick Herrick, the Mayor of Big Bear Lake, in the November general election.

Personal life 
Smith lives in Apple Valley, California with his wife Margaret.

Election results

2020

References

External links

Living people
1958 births
People from Hesperia, California
People from Apple Valley, California
21st-century American politicians
Mayors of places in California
Republican Party members of the California State Assembly